Rangiriri was a flag station about  south-east of Rangiriri, on the North Island Main Trunk line, in the Waikato District of New Zealand,  south of Auckland.

History 
The station opened on 13 August 1877.

Track doubling to ease congestion had been authorised in 1914, but work was delayed by the war. Doubling from Ohinewai to Te Kauwhata didn't open until 14 December 1958. Rangiriri was a tablet station by 1918. A cattle yard was built in 1925. Automatic colour light signals were installed in 1930 and electric lighting in 1938.

From 1925 Firth’s had a pumice concrete works near the station, beside Te Onetea Stream, making products, such as garden rollers, water troughs, concrete posts, pipes, and washing coppers, until it relocated to Frankton about 1934, though a 1935 advertorial was by Firth Concrete, Rangiriri. 1896 returns show that Firth had an interest in goods traffic at Rangiriri at that time.

Incidents 
A goods train was derailed by wrongly set points in 1884.

On a bridge north of Rangiriri a pedestrian was killed in 1914 and another in 1919.

A rail worker was killed on a jigger to the north of the station in 1941.

A truck driver was killed at the station site when the Northern Explorer hit his truck at Te Onetea Road level crossing on 27 February 2014. No one on the train was injured.

References 

Railway stations in New Zealand
Buildings and structures in Waikato
Rail transport in Waikato
Waikato District
Railway stations opened in 1877
Railway stations closed in 1957
1877 establishments in New Zealand